S-Type may refer to:

 S-Type (music producer), a Scottish producer and DJ
 S-type asteroid, asteroids with siliceous mineralogical composition
 S type fuse, electrical fuses with an Edison base
 S-type granite, a category of granite 
 S-type star, a cool giant with equal carbon and oxygen in its atmosphere
 Bedford S type, a truck 1950–1959
 Jaguar S-Type (disambiguation), two makes of car
 Jensen S-type, a car
 Renault S-Type engine, or Sofim 8140, a car engine
 Soviet S-class submarine, during World War 2
 New South Wales S type carriage stock, an Australian railway carriage 
 Victorian Railways S type carriage, an Australian railway carriage

See also 

 Class S (disambiguation)
 Type S (disambiguation)
 S class (disambiguation)